The Bracklesham Group (formerly Bracklesham Beds), in geology, is a series of clays and marls, with sandy and lignitic beds, in the middle Eocene of the Hampshire Basin and London Basin of England.

The type section of the Bracklesham Group is the sea cliffs at Whitecliff Bay on the Isle of Wight, and it is also well developed on the mainland. The Group gets its name from a section at Bracklesham in Sussex. The thickness of the deposit is around 120 m. Fossil mollusca are abundant, and fossil fish are to be found, as well as Palaeophis, a sea-snake, and Puppigerus, a sea turtle. Nummulites and other foraminifera also occur.

The Bracklesham Group lies between the Barton Clay above and the Bournemouth Beds, Lower Bagshot, below. In the London Basin, these beds are represented only by thin sandy clays in the Middle Bagshot group. In the Paris Basin the "Calcaire grossier" lies upon the same geological horizon.

References

Attribution
 This cites:
F. Dixon, Geology of Sussex (new ed., 1878)
F. E. Edwards and SV Wood, Monograph of Eocene Mollusca, Palaeontographical Soc. vol. i. (1847–1877)
Geology of the Isle of Wight, Mem. Geol. Survey (2nd ed., 1889)
C. Reid, The Geology of the Country around Southampton, Mem. Geol. Survey (1902).
New Forest Geology Guide

Geological groups of the United Kingdom
Eocene Series of Europe
Paleogene England
Lithostratigraphy of England